Avoca Vale is a rural locality in the Somerset Region, Queensland, Australia.

History 
The locality was officially named and bounded on 9 July 1999.

On 1 February 2018, Avoca Vale's postcode changed from 4306 to 4314.

References 

Suburbs of Somerset Region
Localities in Queensland